Philosina buchi is a large flatwing damselfly in the family Philosinidae.  It can be found in China (Fujian, Guangdong, and Guangxi).

References 

Query Results

Calopterygoidea
Insects described in 1917